ʽAbdul Qadir Badayuni (1540–1615) was a historian and translator and lived in the Mughal Empire.

He translated the Hindu works, the Ramayana and the Mahabharata (Razmnama).

Life
He was the son of Muluk Shah. He lived in Basavar as a boy studying in Sambhal and Agra. He moved to Badaun, the town after which he was named, in 1562 before moving to Patiala to enter the service of prince Husayn Khan for the next nine years. His later years of study were led by Muslim mystics. The Mughal emperor, Akbar, appointed him to the religious office in the royal courts in 1574 where he spent much of his career.

Major works
Badayuni wrote Muntakhab-ut-Tawarikh (Selection of Chronicles) or Tarikh-i-Badayuni (Badayuni's History) which was completed in 1595 (1004 AH). This work in three volumes is a general history of the Muslims of India. The first volume contains an account of Babur and Humayun. The second volume exclusively deals with Akbar's reign up to 1595. This volume is an unusually frank and critical account of Akbar's administrative measures, in particular, his religious views and his conduct. This volume was kept concealed until Akbar's death and was published after Jahangir's accession. This book gives a contemporary perspective regarding the development of Akbar's views on religion and his religious policy. The third volume describes the lives and works of Muslim religious figures, scholars, physicians and poets.

The first printed edition of the text of this work was published by the College Press, Calcutta in 1865 and later this work was translated into English by G.S.A. Ranking (Vol.I), W.H. Lowe (Vol.II) and T.W. Haig (Vol.III) (published by the Asiatic Society, Calcutta between 1884 and 1925 as a part of their Bibliotheca Indiaca series).

In popular culture
Irrfan Khan played Badayuni in Doordarshan's historical drama Bharat Ek Khoj (1988-1989).

He was portrayed by Aayam Mehta in Taj: Divided by Blood.

Notes

References
 "Bada'uni, 'Abd al-Qadir." Encyclopædia Britannica. 2005. Encyclopædia Britannica Online. 16 November 2005 .
  Muntakhab al-Tavarikh (in Persian) Volume 2 .
 All three volumes of his Muntakhab al-Tavarikh (in English) are available and searchable here: http://persian.packhum.org/persian/
 Muntakhabu-t-tawārīkh, Volume 1 (1898)

External links

 The Muntakhabu-'rūkh by ʽAbdu-'l-Qādir Ibn-i-Mulūk Shāh, (Al-Badāoni) Packard Humanities Institute
 Tārīkh-i Badāūnī, a translation from Volume V of The History of India, as Told by Its Own Historians, 1867

1540 births
1610s deaths
Historians from the Mughal Empire
People from Budaun district
16th-century Indian Muslims
Grand Muftis of India
16th-century Indian historians
16th-century Indian translators
Akbar
Scholars from Uttar Pradesh
17th-century Indian translators